Goin' To Rockingham is the fifth album released by surf music band The Surfin' Lungs, released in 2002 on the Spanish label No Tomorrow. This was the most productive longplayer released by the band yet as it contained 17 tracks, three of which were covers: "The Godfather", written by Nino Rota for the film of the same name; "Surfin' Hearse" had originally been a Jan & Dean song, which had been included on their 1963 album Drag City; "In The Sun" was a Blondie song. Rockingham also featured the first lead vocal from Clive Gilling, "Go Mr Gasser (Go! Go! Go!)". Overall the album was very similar in style to previous longplayer Hang Loose with The Surfin' Lungs, again epitomising the group's focus on sun, surfing, cars and girls to great effect.

Track listing
 Goin' To Rockingham (Pearce) – Lead vocals: Chris Pearce
 She'd Rather Be With The Sea (Dean) – Lead vocals: Chris Pearce
 Their Car Club (Dean) – Lead vocals: Chris Pearce
 The Godfather (Rota) – Instrumental
 Where Young Men Go To Cry (Pearce) – Lead vocals: Chris Pearce
 Long Live Summer (Webb, Pearce, Dean) – Lead vocals: Chris Pearce
 Cathy's Little Coupe (Pearce) – Lead vocals: Chris Pearce
 Flashpoint (Dean) – Instrumental
 There's Something Under The Pier (Pearce, Dean) – Lead vocals: Chris Pearce
 Summertime Radio (Dean) – Lead vocals: Chris Pearce
 Surfin' Hearse (Berry, Christian) – Lead vocals: Chris Pearce
 Never Goin' Back (Dean) – Lead vocals: Chris Pearce
 Lonely Surfer Boy (Dean) – Lead vocals: Chris Pearce
 Fajitas (Dean) – Instrumental
 Go Mr Gasser (Go! Go! Go!) (Gilling) – Lead vocals: Clive Gilling
 In The Sun (Stein) – Lead vocals: Chris Pearce
 Surfin' To Forget About You (Dean) – Lead vocals: Chris Pearce

Personnel
 Chris Pearce – vocals, guitar
 Steve Dean – vocals, bass
 Clive Gilling – vocals, guitar, keyboards, organ
 Ray Webb – drums, vocals, percussion

Trivia
 Long Live Summer was the only song written by drummer Ray Webb that The Surfin' Lungs ever released.

2002 albums
The Surfin' Lungs albums